KATA-CD was a Class A digital television station affiliated with Shop LC, owned and operated by Mako Communications. It broadcast on Channel 50 and was licensed to Mesquite, Texas. KATA was available through Charter Communications (Channel 93) and Verizon Fios (Channel 24).

Digital programming
This station's digital channel was multiplexed:

Analog-to-digital conversion
On June 4, 2009, KATA-CA ceased analog broadcasting and switched over to digital. The station's call sign was changed to KATA-CD on July 8, 2009.

History
The station began its broadcasting activities on Channel 60 as a repeater for former FamilyNet affiliate K46EV (now KJJM-LD) until it picked up a new affiliate with the former America's Voice network until that network's end in 2000. On October 3, 2005, KATA was made a Class A Station, moved its broadcasts to channel 50, and switched affiliates to the English version of Almavision. After a few missteps, the English network was dropped. In early 2006, KATA became a flagship station for the Mexico-based Multimedios Televisión network.

KATA went off the air briefly in late 2007. In February 2008, however, it returned to the airwaves as an MTV Tr3́s affiliate. Sometime in 2012, Tr3́s was replaced by LATV.

In June 2013, KATA-CD was sold to Landover 5 LLC as part of a larger deal involving 51 other low-power television stations.

It was announced on April 13, 2017, that KATA-CD would be one of many stations ceasing operations as part of the FCC's latest Spectrum repack sometime in late 2018. Mako Communications surrendered KATA-CD's license to the FCC for cancellation on September 5, 2017, in exchange for $19,602,242.

References

External links

Spanish-language television stations in Texas
Television channels and stations established in 1995
Low-power television stations in the United States
ATA-CD
1995 establishments in Texas
Defunct television stations in the United States
Television channels and stations disestablished in 2017
2017 disestablishments in Texas
ATA-CD